Massimo Wilde (22 May 1944 – 1 November 2017) was an Italian politician.

He was born in Sirmione in 1944. In 1980, Wilde opened a clothing store. He was a co-founder of the Lombardy chapter of Lega Nord, which he represented in the senate from 1994 to 2001. After stepping down at the end of his second term, Wilde became active in the municipal politics of his hometown.

References

1944 births
2017 deaths
Politicians from the Province of Brescia
Lega Nord politicians
Senators of Legislature XII of Italy
Senators of Legislature XIII of Italy
Politicians of Lombardy